Louis Demetrius Alvanis (born 21 December 1960) is a British classical pianist. He made his concerto debut at the Royal Festival Hall at the age of twenty. Alvanis plays the full range of keyboard repertoire from the Baroque masters  to contemporary serious music. He is particularly known for his performances of the Romantics, especially Chopin, Schumann and Brahms some of which have been recorded on CD with Meridian Records. Commenting on his recording of Chopin’s Three Piano Sonatas, Fanfare Magazine remarked, “this is playing of a gifted and greatly cultivated Chopin pianist”.

References

External links
Homepage

1960 births
Alumni of the Royal Academy of Music
British classical pianists
Male classical pianists
Living people
20th-century classical pianists
21st-century classical pianists
20th-century British male musicians
20th-century British musicians
21st-century British male musicians